Eurasia Shopping Mall is a shopping mall located in Changchun, Jilin province, north-east China.

External links

 http://www.ccoymc.com/indexen.jsp Official Site

Shopping malls in Changchun
Buildings and structures in Jilin